Brealeys is a village in Devon, England.

References

External links

Villages in Devon